Suchitra Krishnamoorthi is an Indian actress, model and singer known for her works in Hindi cinema, South cinema, and Television.

Early life

Suchitra was born in Mumbai, Maharashtra into a Telugu speaking family to V. Krishnamoorthi, former commissioner of income tax and Dr Sulochana Krishnamoorthi, a historian and a professor. She was married to the filmmaker Shekhar Kapur, who was 30 years elder than her; but they are now divorced.  They have a daughter named Kaveri Kapur.

Career
Suchitra started her career with the TV series Chunauti while still in school in the year 1987–88. She acted in a production of Peanuts: The Musical, a musical based on the famous comic strip Peanuts. She played the character Lucy. She appeared in television commercials endorsing products such as Palmolive soap, Clearasil, Sunrise Coffee, Limca and Colgate toothpaste. In 1994, she made her breakthrough in films with Kabhi Haan Kabhi Naa, a commercial and critically acclaimed hit, opposite Shahrukh Khan. She also starred in Kilukkampetti opposite Malayalam star Jayaram.

She simultaneously pursued a music career in the mid- to late 1990s, releasing the pop albums Dole Dole, Dum Tara, Aha and Zindagi. She returned after ten years later in the film My Wife's Murder (2005), opposite Anil Kapoor. The film received good reviews for Suchitra as a performer. The year 2010 saw the release of Rann, a film about the Indian media, directed by Ram Gopal Varma. Suchitra played the role of a media executive named Nalini Kashyap.

Suchitra is a writer whose views were first noticed via her blogs. Her many blogs – first on www.intentblog.com, a site where she was invited to share her views by Deepak Chopra, "art in a body part" and "give me another break", and subsequently on her own site  – have put Suchitra in the midst of many controversies. Suchitra's first novel, The Summer of Cool, was released by Penguin India in January 2009 and met with huge success. It is her first in four called the Swapnalok Society series. Based on the ethos of growing up in a typical co-operative housing society in Mumbai, this genre and these stories have struck a chord with young urban Indians. The second book in the series is called The Good News Reporter and was well received. The third part of the series "The Ghost on the Ledge" was released in 2016.

Drama Queen a first person memoir by Suchitra released in November 2013 has been receiving rave reviews.  The first print of the book sold out within a week from its release date.

Drama Queen a musical play written by Suchitra adapted from her book Drama Queen opened at "NCPA" Mumbai in October 2016. Drama Queen the stage play is currently playing successfully all over India.

Filmography

Films

Television

Discography

Studio albums

Compilation albums

References

External links

 
 Suchitra Krishnamoorthi Official Website

Living people
Telugu people
20th-century Indian actresses
Indian film actresses
Indian women singers
Indian women pop singers
Indian women playback singers
Actresses from Mumbai
Actresses in Hindi cinema
Year of birth missing (living people)
Female models from Mumbai
Actresses in Malayalam cinema
21st-century Indian actresses
Actresses in Hindi television